The Revue Bénédictine is a biannual peer-reviewed academic journal published since 1884 from Maredsous Abbey by the Order of Saint Benedict and Belgian publishing house Brepols. The journal covers church history and church writing (in English, French, Italian, and German) as well as primary texts. The first six volumes were published under the title Le Messager des fidèles (1884–1889). The journal is abstracted and indexed in Scopus.

References

External links
 

Order of Saint Benedict
Religion history journals
Publications established in 1884
Biannual journals
Multilingual journals
Catholic studies journals
Historiography of Christianity
Brepols academic journals